The VT250 or  Spada MC20 is a Honda motorcycle built between late 1988 and the end of 1989.

The VT250 Spada used Nissin brakes, Enkei wheels and a Showa rear-shock. The model was principally marketed in Asia, Australia and New Zealand. Following the VT250 Spada, the Honda VTR250 was produced, which had a trellis frame in place of the cast aluminium frame.

Predecessor
The VT250F is a semi-faired, sport bike first produced by Honda in 1982.

The motorcycle had a DOHC 4-valve-per-cylinder, 90-degree water-cooled V-twin engine, which significantly reduced primary vibration when compared to inline twin engines used on similar machines. The V-twin engine also allowed the motorcycle to have a low centre of gravity and a low seat height.

The front brake was a single inboard ventilated disc that was developed to improve brake performance and feel. This was only seen on Honda models for a few years, before a switch to sintered metal brake pads with the more traditional disc/caliper arrangement. Other features included a hydraulic clutch, Comstar wheels with tubeless tyres, TRAC anti-dive front forks and Pro-Link rear suspension. Engine coolant passed through one of the frame tubes. The early UK specification model had built-in front fairing indicators, and optional radiator side-cowls and belly pan. Following the VT250F, the VT250 Spada and VTR250 were produced.

Successor
The Honda VTR250 is a 90° V-twin motorcycle produced by Honda that has so far had one major revision. The original VTR250 was a faired model sold only in the USA and Canada from 1988 to 1990. The current model VTR250 is a naked bike, produced from 1997 to the present, available only in the Asia-Pacific region, and for 2009, Europe.

The Honda Interceptor VTR250 was sold only in the United States from 1988 to 1990, with moderate changes occurring over the three model years. With a  four-stroke liquid-cooled DOHC V-twin engine and a six-speed transmission, VTR250 was the smallest of Honda's Interceptor line of motorcycles.

The 1990 model had a 17-inch front wheel and the front disc brakes were external.

Specifications

All specifications are manufacturer claimed as per specific model owners manuals and workshop service manuals, except as stated,

Notes

VT250
Motorcycles introduced in 1988